The University of Cologne is a university in Cologne, Germany. It was established in the year 1388 and is one of the most prestigious and research intensive universities in Germany. It was the sixth university to be established in Central Europe. It closed in 1798 before being re-established in 1919. It is now one of the largest universities in Germany with more than 50,000 students. The University of Cologne is a member of the German U15 association of major research-intensive universities and was a university of excellence as part of the German Universities Excellence Initiative from 2012 to 2019. It is constantly ranked among top 20 German universities in the world rankings.  

University of Cologne has 4 Clusters of Excellence; CECAD Cluster of Excellence for Aging Research, Cluster of Excellence ECONtribute: Markets & Public Policy, CEPLAS Cluster of Excellence for Plant Sciences and Cluster of Excellence Matter and Light for Quantum Information (ML4Q). As of 2022, among its notable alumni, faculty and researchers are 4 Nobel Laureates, 11 Gottfried Wilhelm Leibniz Prize winners, 7 Humboldt Professorship winners, 2 Humboldt Research Awards winners and 1 Rhodes Scholar.

History

1388–1798
The university of Cologne was established in 1388 as the fourth university in the Holy Roman Empire, after the Charles University of Prague (1348), the University of Vienna (1365) and the Ruprecht Karl University of Heidelberg (1386). The charter was signed by Pope Urban VI. The university began teaching on 6 January 1389.

In 1798, the university was abolished by the French First Republic, who had invaded Cologne in 1794, because under the new French constitution, many universities were abolished all over France. The last rector Ferdinand Franz Wallraf was able to preserve the university's Great Seal, now once more in use.

1919–today

In 1919, the Prussian government endorsed a decision by the Cologne City Council to re-establish the university. This was considered to be a replacement for the loss of the University of Strasbourg on the west bank of the Rhine, which contemporaneously reverted to France with the rest of Alsace. On 29 May 1919, the Cologne Mayor Konrad Adenauer signed the charter of the modern university.

At that point, the new university was located in Neustadt-Süd, but relocated to its current campus in Lindenthal on 2 November 1934. The old premises are now being used for the Cologne University of Applied Sciences.

Initially, the university was composed of the Faculty of Business, Economics and Social Sciences (successor to the Institutes of Commerce and of Communal and Social Administration) and the Faculty of Medicine (successor to the Academy of Medicine). In 1920, the Faculty of Law and the Faculty of Arts were added, from which latter the School of Mathematics and Natural Sciences was split off in 1955 to form a separate Faculty. In 1980, the two Cologne departments of the Rhineland School of Education were attached to the university as the Faculties of Education and of Special Education. In 1988, the university became a founding member of the Community of European Management Schools and International Companies (CEMS), today's Global Alliance in Management Education.

The university is a leader in the area of economics and is regularly placed in top positions for law and business, both for national and international rankings.

Organization

The University of Cologne is a statutory corporation (Körperschaft des öffentlichen Rechts), operated by the Federal State of North Rhine-Westphalia.

Faculties
The university is divided into six faculties, which together offer 200 fields of study. The faculties are those of Management, Economics and Social Sciences, Law, Medicine (with the affiliated University clinic), Arts, Mathematics and Natural Sciences and Human Sciences.

Rectors

On 24 November 2004, the physicist Axel Freimuth was elected as Rector of the University. His (initially four-year) term began on 1 April 2005. He succeeded Tassilo Küpper and was the 49th Rector since 1919. He was previously Dean of Mathematics and Natural Sciences.

Academic profile
University of Cologne is member of the association German U15 e.V. which is a coalition of fifteen major research-intensive and leading medical universities in Germany with a full disciplinary spectrum, excluding any defining engineering sciences.

CWTS Leiden ranking, ranks Cologne as among top 15 universities in Germany for medicine studies. According to Shanghai ranking, the University of Cologne is eighth best in Germany.

Especially the faculties of law and economics are renowned and leading in Germany. Leading researchers are affiliated to Cologne: e.g. Angelika Nußberger, Thomas von Danwitz, Claus Kreß, Martin Henssler, Ulrich Preis, Heinz-Peter Mansel.

7 people associated with the university have won the prestigious Alexander von Humboldt Professorship prize. 

Apart from these, affiliated persons with the university have won various awards including Max Planck Research Award, Cologne Innovation Prize (City of Cologne), Postbank Finance Award (Deutsche Postbank), Ernst Jung Prize in Medicine (Jung Foundation), SASTRA Ramanujan Prize, Wilhelm Vaillant Prize (Wilhlem Vaillant Foundation), Heinz Maier Leibnitz Prize (DFG), Alfried Krupp Prize for the Advancement of Young Professors, Innovation Prize of the State of NRW, Karl Arnold Prize (North Rhine-Westphalia Academy of Sciences and Arts) and many more.

Museums and collections
GeoMuseum: The only natural history museum in Cologne
Theatre Collection in Schloss Wahn: images and text from European theater from the 16th century
Max Bruch Archive of the Institute of Musicology: autographs and writings from and about Max Bruch
The Kathy Acker Reading Room, the personal library of author Kathy Acker. 
Musical Instrument Collection of the Musicology Institute
Egyptian collection: Papyri and parchments, ceramics and small sculptures
Prehistoric collection artefacts from all periods of prehistoric and early history also from foreign sites, from the Neanderthal fist to the bronze sword and iron weapons of the early Middle Ages
Papyrus collection of the Institute of Antiquity
Barbarastollen: Under the main building, a mining gallery was built as part of a museum for trade and industry in 1932

Students and faculty

In 2005, the university enrolled 47,203 students, including 3,718 graduate students. In 2003, the number of post-doctoral researchers was 670.

There were 6,157 international students in the 2005 Summer Semester (approximately 13% of all students). Those from developing countries made up about 60%, representing a total of 123 nations. The largest contingents came from Bulgaria (10.5%), Russia (8.8%), Poland (7.4%), China (6.2%) and Ukraine (5.7%).

There are 508 professors at the university, including 70 women. In addition, the university employs 1,549 research assistants, with an additional 765 at the clinic, and 1,462 other assistants (3,736 at the clinic).

Partner universities
The University of Cologne maintains twenty official partnerships with universities from ten countries. Of these, the partnerships with Clermont-Ferrand I and Pennsylvania State are the oldest partnerships. In addition, Cologne has further cooperations with more than 260 other universities.

Federal University of Ceará, Fortaleza, Brazil (since 1990)
Sofia University St. Kliment Ohridski, Sofia, Bulgaria (since 1985)
Sun Yat-sen University, Guangzhou, Guangdong, China (since 2005)
Fudan University, Shanghai, China (since 2010)
Université d'Auvergne, Clermont-Ferrand I, France (since 1962)
Université Blaise Pascal, Clermont-Ferrand II, France (since 1980)
Aristotle University of Thessaloniki, Thessaloniki, Greece (since 1992)
National Law School of India University, Bangalore, India
Hitotsubashi University, Tokyo, Japan (since 1987)
Keio University, Tokyo, Japan (since 1981)
University of Wrocław, Wrocław, Poland (since 2003)
University of Rajshahi, Rajshahi, Bangladesh
Jagiellonian University, Kraków, Poland (since 1990)
Maxim Gorky Literature Institute, Moscow, Russia
Volgograd State University, Russia (since 1993)
University of Seville, Spain
Charles University, Prague, Czech Republic (since 1999)
Istanbul University, Istanbul, Turkey (since 2003)
University of California at Berkeley, School of Law, Berkeley, CA, U.S.
Duquesne University, Pittsburgh, PA, U.S. (since 2001)
Pennsylvania State University, State College, PA, U.S. (since 1961)

Notable alumni and professors

Albertus Magnus
Thomas Aquinas
Kurt Alder (Nobel Prize in Chemistry 1950)
Benjamin List (Nobel Prize in Chemistry 2021)
Peter Grünberg (Nobel Prize in Physics 2007)
Heinrich Böll (Nobel Prize for Literature)
Karl Carstens (president of the Federal Republic of Germany 1979–1984)
Gustav Heinemann (president of the Federal Republic of Germany 1969 to 1974)
Karolos Papoulias (former president of the Hellenic Republic)
Martin Broszat (1926–1989), historian 
Ute Deichmann, historian
Erich Gutenberg (founder of modern German business studies)
Amos Grunebaum, obstetrician and gynecologist
Jenny Gusyk, a Jewish woman of Turkish citizenship, was the first female and foreign student to be enrolled in 1919.
Sasa Hanten-Schmidt, lawyer and publicist
Hans Mayer (1907–2001), literary scholar
Stephan Noller (born 1970), internet-entrepreneur, founder and former committee chairman 
Ernst Alfred Philippson (1900–1993), philologist 
Axel Ockenfels
Katja Terlau (born 1970), art historian and provenance researcher
Andreas Kaplan, German economist
Eberhard Voit

In popular culture
The University of Cologne was commemorated on the Federal Republic of Germany's postage stamp in 1988, celebrating university's 600 years.

See also
List of medieval universities

References

Further reading

External links

  
 Absolventennetzwerk der Universität zu Köln 

 
1380s establishments in the Holy Roman Empire
1388 establishments in Europe
Lindenthal, Cologne
Educational institutions established in the 14th century
Universities and colleges in Cologne